Jacqueline Lord (born 1 August 1947) is an English-born New Zealand former cricketer who played as a right-arm leg break bowler. She appeared in 15 Test matches and 15 One Day Internationals  for New Zealand between 1966 and 1982. She played domestic cricket for North Shore, Canterbury and Wellington.

Lord holds the record for the best bowling figures in the Women's Cricket World Cup history, taking 6/10 against India on 14 January 1982.

References

External links
 
 

1947 births
Living people
Cricketers from Rochdale
New Zealand women cricketers
New Zealand women Test cricketers
New Zealand women One Day International cricketers
North Shore women cricketers
Canterbury Magicians cricketers
Wellington Blaze cricketers